Safir  was a Belgian professional cycling team that existed from 1978 to 1988. A notable rider was Herman Van Springel, who won the one-day endurance race Bordeaux–Paris twice with the team.

References

Cycling teams based in Belgium
Defunct cycling teams based in Belgium
1978 establishments in Belgium
1988 disestablishments in Belgium
Cycling teams established in 1978
Cycling teams disestablished in 1988